In the epic Mahabharata, Uttara/Uttar was the prince of Matsya Kingdom and the eldest son of King Virata, at whose court the Pandavas spent one year in concealment during their exile. His sister Uttarā married Abhimanyu, son of Arjuna.

Major episode

Uttara is the son of Virata in mahabharata. According in Manava Purana, Uttara was incarnation of Sudharshana Chakra. 

Towards the end of the year that the Pandavas spent at the Matsya Kingdom, Duryodhana (suspecting that the Pandavas were hiding in Matsya) attacked that kingdom. The army of Hastinapura stood at the borders of Matsya, but King Virata had already taken his entire army to fight the Trigarta army attacking from the south. When news arrives at the palace, Uttar confidently boasts about how he will single-handedly wipe out the Kauravas, downplaying their abilities. Upon the prodding of his mother and her maid, he takes his sister's dancing teacher, the eunuch Brihannala, who was in reality Arjuna, as his charioteer. As they approach the Kuru army, Uttar panics at the sight and asks Brihannala to turn back. When he refuses, citing Kshatriya dharma, Uttar dismounts the chariot and runs for his life, only for Arjuna to run up to him and catch him. In order to fortify Uttar's courage, Arjuna revealed his true identity. Uttar was incredulous and initially refused to believe Arjuna; only after Arjuna had recited his ten aliases did Uttar believe that Brihannala was indeed Arjuna in disguise. Arjuna then took charge and single-handedly defeated the entire Hastinapura army.

Mahabharata war

During the 18-day Kurukshetra war, Uttar and his brothers fight in support of the Pandavas. Uttar is killed on the first day of the war by Shalya. 

As the battle starts, the battle is tilted in favor of the Kauravas as Bhishma is unable to be contained. Going on the attack, Uttar aggressively takes his chariot deep into the Kaurava formation where he is checked by Shalya who asks Uttar to introduce himself. Uttar boasts about his martial skill and compares himself to Krishna, having been Arjuna's charioteer in the Virat war. Shalya sharply rebukes Uttar for his arrogance, telling him that "his tongue is sharper than his arrows." Uttar responds with a fierce attack. He snaps Shalya's bow, wounds him, kills his charioteer and horses while breaking the wheels of Shalya's chariot. As Shalya is defenestrated, Uttar aims the killing blow, mockingly asking Shalya "is this my tongue, or my arrow that will kill you?" From the ground, Shalya hurls a spear through Uttar's body mortally wounding him. As Uttar collapses in his chariot, Shalya comes over and mourns the death of such a brave child. In the Chatahurdi compilation, Uttar's brother Sweta, who witnessed the ghastly death of his brother, immediately went into a frenzy and started attacking the Kaurava army with hundreds of arrows and inflicted heavy losses on them. Bheeshma, unable to contain his rage shot the Bhramastra at Sweta, killing him instantly.  Thus the two brothers died on the same day, within minutes of each other.

References

Characters in the Mahabharata